2020 UA is a tiny near-Earth asteroid around  across that passed within  of Earth on 21 October 2020 at 02:00 UT.

References

External links 
 Near-Earth Asteroid 2020 UA extremely close encounter: online observations – 20 Oct. 2020
 
 
 

Discoveries by MLS
Minor planet object articles (unnumbered)
20201021
20201016